Lette can refer to:

Geography
Lette (Coesfeld), a part of Coesfeld, North Rhine-Westphalia, Germany
Lette (Oelde), a part of Oelde, North Rhine-Westphalia, Germany
Lette, New South Wales, a locality in New South Wales, Australia

People
Henry Lette (1829–1892), Australian cricketer
Kathy Lette (born 1958), Australian author
Virginia Lette, Australian radio and television presenter